Peebles Hydro is an early 20th century  hotel and spa resort in Peebles, in the historic county of Peebles-shire in the Scottish Borders. It is one of two hydropathic hotels left in Scotland,  the other being Crieff Hydro in Perthshire.

The hotel opened in 1881, but burnt down and was rebuilt in 1907. It served as a hospital for injured service personnel during the First World War before reverting to hotel use. Peebles Hydro is a category B listed building, and is still operated as a hotel.

History
Peebles Hydro was designed in 1878 by John Starforth. It opened by the Hydropathic Company in 1881 to provide water cures and hydrotherapy remedies (pain-relief and treating illness) to guests. It was one of many such hotels built in Britain during the second half of the 19th century. It was near to two railway stations: Peebles West railway station of the Caledonian Railway, later London, Midland and Scottish Railway, and Peebles East of the North British Railway, later London and North Eastern Railway. It began building in 1878. Work was completed early in 1881 at a cost of over £70,000. The architect was John Starforth (1828-1898), a pupil of David Bryce. The Hydro burnt down in July 1905 and was rebuilt by 1907, a building designed by the architect James Miller of Edinburgh, at a more moderate cost of £37,000 owing to the use of salvaged materials.

During the Second World War it was turned into a hospital, the 23rd (Scottish) General Hospital T.A. with 1,200 beds.

The cast of the 1970 film Tam-Lin including its star Ava Gardner, and cast members Joanna Lumley and Stephanie Beecham stayed in the hotel while filming on location at Traquair House. 

It was taken over by Crieff Hydro in February 2014.

Treatments and regime
When it first opened, the following baths and treatments were offered: Russian, Turkish, peat, Nauheim, aromatic, medicated, eucalyptus, rain, pine extract, spray, vapour, brine or sulphur baths. Many associated treatments were available: vibration-massage, the Oertel or Terrain cure, the sun and air bath, a nebular, Metchnikoff's sour milk treatment, the Johann Schroth diet, the grape cure, the Salisbury system, a high-protein weight loss diet using Salisbury Steak or the Koumiss cure. As at Crieff Hydro there were outdoor recreations, from otter hunting to tennis, shooting, croquet and cycling, and a wide range of activities for inclement weather and the evenings. Guests were encouraged to bring their musical instruments.

References

External links

The Story of Peebles Hydro

Hotels established in 1881
1881 establishments in Scotland
Hotel spas
James Miller buildings
Category B listed buildings in the Scottish Borders
Listed hotels in Scotland
Buildings and structures completed in 1907
Peebles
Hotels in the Scottish Borders